Graeme Manson is a Canadian screenwriter and producer from Vancouver, British Columbia. He is known for his work on the acclaimed BBC America and Space science fiction thriller television series Orphan Black.

Career
He co-wrote the 1997 film Cube and has written for television for several years since, including The Bridge, Flashpoint, and Being Erica.

With John Fawcett, he is the co-creator and executive producer of the acclaimed and award-winning BBC America and Space science fiction thriller television series Orphan Black, for which he also has written many episodes. The two previously had collaborated on the 2001 film Lucky Girl. The series was a success critically and commercially. It premiered on March 30, 2013, on Space in Canada and on BBC America in the United States. On June 16, 2016, the series was renewed for a fifth and final 10-episode season, which premiered on June 10, 2017. The series won a Peabody Award in 2013, and has won and been nominated for several Canadian Screen Awards.

He will be the executive producer for the upcoming TV adaptation of Whatever, Linda, an award-winning web series.

He currently serves as the co-showrunner of the TV adaptation of Snowpiercer with Josh Friedman.

Awards
With John Fawcett, he received the 2015 CFC Award for Creative Excellence from the Canadian Film Centre for his work on Orphan Black. He has also won three Canadian Screen Awards, a Hugo Award, and a Writers Guild of Canada award.

References

External links

20th-century Canadian screenwriters
20th-century Canadian male writers
21st-century Canadian screenwriters
21st-century Canadian male writers
Canadian science fiction writers
Canadian male screenwriters
Canadian television writers
Film producers from British Columbia
Canadian television producers
Living people
Showrunners
Canadian Film Centre alumni
Hugo Award-winning writers
Year of birth missing (living people)
Writers from Vancouver